Kevin Nascimento Bueno (29 April 1998 – 16 May 2021), better known by his stage name MC Kevin, was a Brazilian singer of funk carioca and trap, addition to his solo songs, Kevin has a list of collaborative hits with funk artists from São Paulo such as MC Davi, MC Hariel, Kevinho, MC Pedrinho, MC Don Juan, Salvador da Rima, MC Ryan SP, among others.

Musical career 
Son of Valquíria Nascimento (mother) and Agnaldo Barros (father), MC Kevin was born in Villa Ede, in northern São Paulo. He started being involved in the music business in 2013, and began to be successful on the KondZilla and GR6 Music YouTube channels.  The singer became known for hits such as "O Menino Encantou a Quebrada",  "Cavalo de Troia", "Pra Inveja é Tchau" and "Veracruz".

In addition to his solo songs, Kevin has a list of collaborative hits with funk artists from São Paulo such as MC Davi, MC Hariel, Kevinho, MC Pedrinho, MC Don Juan, Salvador da Rima, MC Ryan SP, among others.

Personal life 
MC Kevin was married to criminal lawyer Deolane Bezerra from 29 April 2021 until his death less than three weeks later. The two made the union official in Tulum, Mexico and resided in Mogi das Cruzes, in Greater São Paulo. He had previously been in a relationship with Evelin Gusmão, with whom he had his daughter, Soraya Gusmão.

Last show 
The singer was staying in Rio de Janeiro for a performance at the Mansão Imperador nightclub, located in Madureira, in the northern zone of the city. In the local event known as Baile do Imperador, the singer performed his last show accompanied by his wife, at dawn from 15 to 16 May 2021.

Death 
MC Kevin died at the age of 23, after falling from the fifth floor of the Brisa Barra hotel, where he was staying with his wife and friends, which is located on Avenida Lúcio Costa, in Barra da Tijuca, Rio de Janeiro. The accident occurred on the night of 16 May, and Kevin was taken alive to Miguel Couto Hospital, but he did not survive his injuries. He attempted to hide from his wife so she would not discover his infidelity.

References 

1998 births
2021 deaths
People from São Paulo
Funk carioca musicians
21st-century Brazilian singers
Musicians from São Paulo
Accidental deaths from falls